Winonah Heatley (born 18 June 2001) is an Australian professional football player who plays as a defender for Nordsjælland in the Danish Women's League.

She has previously played for Brisbane Roar in the A-League Women and for Växjö DFF in the Damallsvenskan.

Club career

Brisbane Roar
On 16 February 2020, Heatley made her professional debut in a W-League match against Perth Glory and entered the game as a half-time substitute.

Heatley became a notable part of the side in the 2020–21 W-League season where she made 13 appearances and scored 1 goal, with a total of 1151 minutes.

Växjö DFF
In July 2021, Heatley transferred to Swedish side, Växjö DFF.

She debuted for the Swedish club on August 20, 2021, in the 2021 Damallsvenskan, playing the full 90 minutes against Vittsjö GIK in a 0–0 encounter.

Melbourne City
In November 2021, Heatley returned to Australia, signing with A-League Women club Melbourne City.

Nordsjælland
In June 2022, after one season in Australia, Heatley left overseas again, joining Danish club Nordsjælland.

International
In September 2021, after strong form with Swedish club side, Växjö DFF Heatley earned her first senior Australia call-up for the friendly match against the Republic of Ireland on September 21.

Career statistics

Club 

1Swedish Cup.

References 

Living people
2001 births
Australian women's soccer players
Women's association football defenders
Brisbane Roar FC (A-League Women) players
Växjö DFF players
Melbourne City FC (A-League Women) players
FC Nordsjælland (women) players
A-League Women players
Damallsvenskan players
Australian expatriate women's soccer players
Expatriate women's footballers in Sweden
Australian expatriate sportspeople in Sweden
Australian expatriate sportspeople in Denmark
Expatriate women's footballers in Denmark
Elitedivisionen players